The Cafu Engine is a game engine developed by Carsten Fuchs. It is portable across platforms and runs on Windows and Linux, with plans to be adapted to OS X. The engine's source code is freely available under the MIT Licence.

Features

In general, Cafu is built with a modular architecture so as to avoid program constructs and libraries that are specific to any given operating system, compiler, CPU or graphics processor. To that end, the Cafu source code compiles both as 32- as well as native 64-bit software.

The Cafu Engine abstracts out its handling of materials and instead uses rendering objects, thus enabling users to work with different graphics systems such as OpenGL or DirectX.
Physics are handled by an internal system to deal with human movement, and everything else uses Bullet, a free physics engine; Cafu synchronizes the two systems
Lighting is handled by radiosity computations, or dynamic lighting through stencil shadow volumes
Like the material system, sound is abstracted out and can support various implementations such as OpenAL and FMOD
Inherently designed for online games with multiple players over a computer network
Game server that centrally manages the game state and events, as well as a client that is used by players

Scripting and editing
In order to not have to fix details in difficult to modify program code, the Cafu Engine employs scripting based on the programming language Lua in many parts of the program.

Cafu includes a graphical editor, CaWE, that contains all the tools required to create new levels: a Map Editor, GUI Editor, Font-Wizard, Material Browser and Model Editor.

Licensing
The Cafu Engine's source code has been freely available under the GNU GPLv3 license since December 2009, while offering the option of a commercial license upon agreement with Carsten Fuchs Software. On June 19, 2016, the engine changed its open source license from GPLv3 to the MIT License.

Reviews and applications
The Cafu Engine has been used by the United States Air Force's Research Labs for Human Effectiveness in a study about the visual working memory of pilots.
It has also been used in multiple studies and research projects that simulate artificial lighting in urban environments and examine how that lighting is perceived by humans and influences the nocturnal orientation of pedestrians and motorists:
 Dennis Köhler, 2007: "Artificial light in urban space", presentation and movie report at the 8th Conference of European Architectural Endoscopy Association 2007, Moskau.
 Stefan Hochstadt und Manfred Walz, 2008: "Wahrnehmung von Stadträumen bei Nacht: eine städtebauliche Grundlage zur Lichtplanung im öffentlichen Raum. (Perception of urban environments at night: an urban development basis for lighting planning in public space.)" in: Eberhard Menzel (publisher): Research Report of the University of Applied Sciences and Arts of Dortmund, pages 52–56.
 Dennis Köhler, 2009: "Artificially enlightened urban spaces at night – A matter of special importance for livable cities." in: György Széll & Ute Széll (eds.): Quality of Life & Working Life in Comparison. Peter Lang Verlag, Frankfurt am Main, Germany, pages 323–339.
The Cafu Engine has been reviewed and presented in these publications:
 Clemens Gleich: "Grafik-Engine", c't 14/2005, page 72, http://www.heise.de/kiosk/archiv/ct/2005/14
 Ralf Nebelo, Tobias Engler, Mathias Poets, Lars Bremer, Lukas Liebich: "Geburtstagsgeschenk" (special issue with DVD for the 25th jubilee), c't 24/2008, page 198, http://www.heise.de/kiosk/archiv/ct/2008/24

References

External links
 

Cross-platform free software
Formerly proprietary software
Free game engines
Free software programmed in C++
Game engines for Linux
Lua (programming language)-scriptable game engines
Software using the MIT license
Video game engines